Joseph McCabe (1867–1955) was an English writer and speaker on the subject of rationalism and atheism.

Joseph McCabe may also refer to:
Joseph McCabe (hunter) (1816–1865), South African hunter, trader, explorer and botanical collector
Joe McCabe (hurler) (1919–2019), Irish hurler
Joe McCabe (baseball) (born 1938), American baseball player
Joseph McCabe (editor) (born 1972), print and online journalist and editor